Miha Tišler (September 18, 1926 – March 25, 2021) was a Slovene chemist who served as a professor of chemistry at the Faculty of Natural Sciences and Technology in Ljubljana, Slovenia.

Tišler was the author of 50 books and monographs on heterocyclic chemistry, and he was named a Knight of the Order of St. Gregory the Great.

Miha Tišler was born in Ljubljana on September 18, 1926. In 1955 he was appointed a professor of chemistry at the University of Ljubljana. In 1977 he received the Kidrič Prize. From 1978 to 1980 he served as the president of International Society of Heterocyclic Chemistry.

References

1926 births
2021 deaths
Slovenian chemists
Academic staff of the University of Ljubljana
Knights of St. Gregory the Great